Divjakë is a municipality and town in Fier County, Albania. The municipality consists of the administrative units of Grabian, Gradishtë, Remas, Tërbuf with Divjakë constituting its seat. As of the Institute of Statistics estimate from the 2011 census, there were 8,445 people residing in Divjakë and 34,254 in Divjakë Municipality.

Geography 
Divjakë is located near the Adriatic Sea coast, in the Myzeqe plain. The area of the municipality is 309.58 km2.

Demography 

According to the 2011 Albanian census, Divjakë was inhabited by an ethnic Albanian majority of 84.16%. Aromanians form the second largest ethnic community, with 2.12% declaring themselves Vlach, that is, Aromanian. Divjake is a considerable center of the Aromanian community within that region. The remaining 13.76% did not declare themselves an ethnicity due to irregularities of the Albanian census taking.

References

External links 

bashkiadivjake.gov.al – Official Website 

 
Administrative units of Divjakë
Municipalities in Fier County
Towns in Albania
Aromanian settlements in Albania